Gunjevci  is a village in the municipality of Kozarska Dubica, Republika Srpska, Bosnia and Herzegovina.

References
Gunjevci ist ein Idylisches Waldreiches und von der Landwirtschaft geprägtes Dorf. Das Dorf unterliegt der Stadt Kozarska Dubica (früher Bosanska Dubica).
Im Dorf wurde ein Denkmal errichtet zum andenken an den Partizanischen Kriegsheld Mile Mećava, der den Deutschen und Kroatischen Ustascha verbänden in einem Heldenhaften kampf den Ersten Panzer eroberte. Beim Denkmal befindet sich ein Richtiger Panzer der von der JNA damaliger Jugoslawischer Armee zur verfügung gestellt wurde.

.

Populated places in Dubica, Bosnia and Herzegovina